Scoop! is a 2016 Japanese suspense comedy drama film directed by  and starring Masaharu Fukuyama. It was released in Japan by Toho on October 1, 2016.

Plot

Cast
Masaharu Fukuyama as Shizuka Miyakonojō
Fumi Nikaidō as Nobi Namekawa
Yō Yoshida as Sadako Yokokawa
Kenichi Takitō as Baba
Lily Franky as Charagen
Takumi Saito
Shinya Tsukamoto
Ren Ishikawa

Reception

References

External links
 

2010s Japanese films
Japanese comedy-drama films
2016 comedy-drama films
Toho films
Films directed by Hitoshi Ōne